Gert Wieczorkowski (born 24 July 1948) is a German former professional footballer who played in Germany and the United States including the North American Soccer League and Major Indoor Soccer League.

In 1971, Wieczorkowski joined FC St. Pauli in the second division Regionalliga Nord. In 1974, he moved to Rot-Weiss Essen which played at the time in the Bundesliga. In 1979, Wieczorkowski moved to the United States and signed with the San Diego Sockers of the North American Soccer League. Over the next six years, Wieczorkowski played five summer outdoor seasons, three NASL indoor seasons and three seasons in the Major Indoor Soccer League with the Sockers. He won four championships, all indoors, with the Sockers. Wieczorkowski also played for UNAM Pumas in Mexico in 1979–1980.

References

External links
 NASL/MISL stats
 

Living people
1948 births
Footballers from Hamburg
West German footballers
Association football midfielders
Association football defenders
Bundesliga players
Major Indoor Soccer League (1978–1992) players
North American Soccer League (1968–1984) indoor players
North American Soccer League (1968–1984) players
Liga MX players
FC St. Pauli players
Rot-Weiss Essen players
San Diego Sockers (NASL) players
San Diego Sockers (original MISL) players
Club Universidad Nacional footballers
West German expatriate footballers
West German expatriate sportspeople in the United States
Expatriate soccer players in the United States
West German expatriate sportspeople in Mexico
Expatriate footballers in Mexico